Daniel Jammer (August 11, 1966) is a German-Israeli businessman. Jammer is the owner and founder of Nation-E, an international Israeli based ICT company specializing in developing energy solutions. He used to own Maccabi Netanya from 2006 to 2011 and also FC Senec from 2003 to 2007. In 2014, Jammer was dubbed one of the leading cyber security figures in Israel by Globes, Israel's leading business magazine.

Life 
Jammer worked fifteen years for the Titan-Industrie firma Tirus in Executive Position and is now founder of Micro Finance Invest.

Personal 
Jammer was raised in Frankfurt am Main. He lives with his wife Elizaveta Bresht, the daughter of Viatcheslav Bresht, a Russian Titan-Oligarch, and his two children's in Herzelia, Israel.

References

External links
  FC Senec Official Website
  Maccabi Netanya F.C. Official Website

1966 births
Living people
Businesspeople from Frankfurt
20th-century German Jews
German emigrants to Israel
German football chairmen and investors
Israeli football chairmen and investors